Patrick ("Pat") Dwyer (born 3 November 1977 in Wagga Wagga, New South Wales) is an Australian athlete specializing in the 400 metres.

He competed in the 2004 Summer Olympics, and was a part of the Australian team that won the silver medal in 4 × 400 metres relay.  In addition he finished seventh with the relay teams at the 2000 Summer Olympics and fifth at the 2002 Commonwealth Games.

His personal bests of 20.60 s (200 m) and 44.73 s (400 m) were both achieved in 2000.

External links 

1977 births
Living people
Australian male sprinters
Athletes (track and field) at the 2000 Summer Olympics
Athletes (track and field) at the 2004 Summer Olympics
Olympic athletes of Australia
Olympic silver medalists for Australia
People educated at St Joseph's College, Hunters Hill
Sportspeople from Wagga Wagga
Athletes (track and field) at the 1998 Commonwealth Games
Athletes (track and field) at the 2002 Commonwealth Games
Medalists at the 2004 Summer Olympics
Olympic silver medalists in athletics (track and field)
Commonwealth Games competitors for Australia